The El Burguillo Reservoir is located along the Alberche river in the province of Ávila, Spain, between the municipalities of El Tiemblo and El Barraco.

It was inaugurated in 1913 and is the first/highest reservoir along the Alberche river. The water is mostly used for agricultural purposes and to generate electricity. It is managed by the Confederación Hidrográfica del Tajo, which also allows recreational activities in the reservoir, such as bathing, sailing and rowing.

See also
 Burguillo Reservoir Arch Bridge

Reservoirs in Castile and León
Alberche